Sam Parry (born 17 December 1991) is a Welsh rugby union player. His position is hooker.

Parry began his rugby career at Llandovery RFC before joining the Scarlets Under-18s and then the Newport Gwent Dragons academy. He made his senior debut for Newport Gwent Dragons against Bath on 15 October 2011. Parry joined the Ospreys for the 2014–15 season.

International

In May 2013 he was selected in the Wales national rugby union team training squad for the summer 2013 tour to Japan.

In January 2014 he was called up to the Wales squad for the 2014 Six Nations Championship.

Parry was called up for Wales for the Autumn Nations Series in 2020. He made his debut off the bench against France. Parry later scored a try in the final match against Italy.

References 

^ Ospreys splash

External links 
 Newport Gwent Dragons profile 
 Ospreys profile

1991 births
Living people
Dragons RFC players
Newport RFC players
Rugby union players from Haverfordwest
Wales international rugby union players
Welsh rugby union players
Ospreys (rugby union) players
Rugby union hookers